Ezra Squier Tipple (1861–1936) was the fifth president  of Drew Theological Seminary from 1912 to 1929.

Biography
He was born in 1861 and had a brother, Bertrand Martin Tipple. He received a Bachelor of Divinity degree from Drew Theological Seminary in 1887.  Tipple died of pneumonia on October 17, 1936.

References

External links
 

1861 births
1936 deaths
Deaths from pneumonia in New York (state)
Presidents of Drew University